Inji is an Arabic female given name. Notable people with the name include:

 Inji Aflatoun (1924–1989), Egyptian painter and activist
 Inji Hanim (died 1890), Egyptian wife of Sa'id Pasha

Arabic feminine given names